Blink-182 (also known as untitled) is the fifth studio album by the American rock band Blink-182, released on November 18, 2003, by Geffen Records. Following their ascent to stardom and success of their prior two releases, the trio was compelled to take a break and subsequently participated in various side projects (Box Car Racer and Transplants). When they regrouped, they felt inspired to approach song structure and arrangements differently on their next effort together.

Recorded from January to October 2003 with producer Jerry Finn, the album has been described as darker and more mature than the band's earlier work. It also marked a musical departure from their previous efforts, infusing experimental elements, inspired by lifestyle changes (the band members all became fathers before the album was released) and side projects, into their usual pop-punk sound. Its songs are sonically expansive and downcast, leading critics to view it as a more elaborate, mature side of the band. The songwriting is more personal in nature and explores darker territory, touching upon the realities of adulthood and unexpected hardships. In addition, its recording process was long and often unconventional.

Fans were generally split regarding the band's "new" direction, but the album proved successful, selling 2.2 million copies in the United States. It received positive reviews, with critics welcoming its change in tone. Lead singles  "Feeling This" and  "I Miss You" received the most radio airplay out of the four singles released, and peaked high on Billboard charts. The worldwide touring schedule, which saw the band travel to Japan and Australia, also found the three performing for troops stationed in the Middle East. The album was the band's last recording with longtime producer Jerry Finn and their final original material before a four-year-long hiatus. It is also their longest studio album to date, clocking in at 49 minutes.

Background

Take Off Your Pants and Jacket became Blink-182's first number one album in the United States upon its June 2001 release; it also hit the top position in Canada and Germany. Hit singles "The Rock Show" and "First Date" continued the band's mainstream success worldwide, with MTV cementing their image as video stars. However, guitarist Tom DeLonge felt that label limitations stifled his creativity, and sessions became contentious among the trio. They rescheduled European tour dates after the September 11 attacks, and they were called off a second time after DeLonge suffered a herniated disc in his back. With time off from touring, DeLonge felt an "itch to do something where he didn't feel locked in to what Blink was," and channeled his chronic back pain and resulting frustration into Box Car Racer (2002), a post-hardcore disc that further explores his Fugazi and Refused inspiration. Refraining from paying for a studio drummer, he invited Blink drummer Travis Barker to record drums on the project.

Box Car Racer, originally a one-time experimental project, became a full-fledged band with Barker behind the kit and Hazen Street guitarist David Kennedy on guitar. Blink bassist Mark Hoppus felt betrayed and jealous, and it would create an unresolved tension within the trio that followed the band for several years. "At the end of 2001, it felt like Blink-182 had broken up. It wasn’t spoken about, but it felt over", said Hoppus later. Barker, meanwhile, joined rap rock group Transplants in 2002 and was featured on their first album, Transplants. In addition, Blink-182 co-headlined the Pop Disaster Tour with Green Day, alongside opening acts Jimmy Eat World, Saves the Day, and Kut U Up in 2002. It was an "uncomfortable" time in the band according to Hoppus, but they had "hundreds of discussions about it" and seemingly moved on. Barker felt the dynamics of the band changed with Hoppus and DeLonge's marriages: "Blink-182 were no longer just three inseparable guys who were touring together." Meanwhile, he began dating model Shanna Moakler, inviting tabloid attention, adding to the "awkwardness" present in the band.

The post-hardcore sound of Box Car Racer inspired the change in tone and experimental nature the band approached Blink-182 with. Hoppus described his desire for the album to experiment with different arrangements in a 2002 interview: "Before, we got one guitar sound that we changed a little bit through the record. This time we want to try a whole different setup for each song." Hoppus recalled that Barker entered the production process by urging the band to "[not think of the album] as the next Blink-182 record — think of it as the first Blink-182 record." The members were also inspired after hearing Houston: We Have a Drinking Problem by Bad Astronaut and its expansive sound. "Once the door was opened by Tom and Travis with Box Car Racer, Mark started to be more on board with that concept. He was also more flexible and the next Blink album was able to be a pretty big departure from the previous two", said assistant engineer Sam Boukas. "Box Car Racer opened the door in that sense and I think the three of them wanted to be more creative and have more creative liberty on that next album."

Recording and production

In January 2003, the band rented a home in the San Diego luxury community of Rancho Santa Fe, planning to record the entire album there. In addition to the home being converted into a studio, pay-per-view pornography was on continuous play, and it included a space to "smoke hella weed" in the garage. The trio ditched their typical previous recording process (writing and demoing several songs and recording them in a studio one instrument at a time) and instead approached each song together. The band "attacked" each song and worked on three to four songs per day, simply moving on to the next one when feeling "burned out" on a track. The band also had fun at the home studio; DeLonge commented, "If I wasn’t smoking half of Colombia I probably ran up $3 million in adult film charges." The band recorded at the home until April 2003, when the owners of the house "kicked them out." Barker, unwilling to leave Moakler, would drive from Los Angeles to San Diego each day. He subsequently left that spring to tour with Transplants, leaving the band with a variety of drum tracks to listen to while he was gone. The band regrouped after being "kicked out" by the owners of the house they were recording in and began recording at Rolling Thunder studios until the band left to perform a couple of summer shows in Canada and Japan, where they premiered several songs live. The in-studio antics and behind the scenes moments were recorded and posted on the official Blink-182 website throughout 2003, as well as on a MTV album release segment.

The recording process of the album eventually lasted from January to August 2003, with an additional mixing and mastering period lasting until October. Previous Blink-182 sessions were recorded in three months. The band stated that being in a studio longer than three months gave them the luxury of experimenting with different methods of writing, playing, and recording. The band built each song with a minute attention to detail. Hoppus described the studio as a "musical laboratory": over 70 guitars, 30 amps, "30 or 40" different snare drums, up to six drum kits, various keyboards, turntables, and pianos were used in the album's production, a lot of which came from Finn's personal collection. Barker was responsible for the turntables and a copy of Pink Floyd's The Wall. The group also enlisted the help of James Guthrie, an engineer behind The Wall. The trio also sent The Cure frontman Robert Smith the bed track of "All of This" in hopes he would contribute; Smith makes a guest appearance and recorded his parts in England. The three initially believed their legitimacy would be in question due to the humor-oriented nature of their earlier recordings, to which Smith responded, "Nobody knows what kind of songs you are going to write in the future and nobody knows the full potential of any band. I really like the music you sent me." The band also collaborated with DJ Shadow and Dan the Automator, and Barker desired to work with The Neptunes. Jerry Finn, who had produced the previous two Blink-182 albums and the Box Car Racer album, returned to produce Blink-182, which would be his final collaboration with the band.

As the record neared completion by August 2003, the band performed for a short time for the armed forces in the Middle East and premiered more new songs at their Reading and Leeds sets. The trio shot small, home-made videos for several songs on Blink-182, as well as the official music video for "Feeling This", the song they picked as the first single. The band spent time to finalize the CD booklet and album artwork in September. Mark Hoppus stated that the album was so "personal to all three of us that we really wanted to be involved in every aspect of it." The release date kept getting missed and pushed back to the point where Jordan Schur, then-president of Geffen Records, made calls asking, "What is the absolute last possible second that we can turn this thing in and still make our release date?" DeLonge described the final days of mixing the album as "crazy stressful", with "literally hours to turn [the album] to have it come it out on time." The album was in production so late that final mixes were still being judged by Hoppus, DeLonge, and Barker the night before the album was sent to the pressing plant. For Barker, he later considered it his favorite time in the band's history, commenting, "That was a good time in my life. I was smoking just enough weed and taking just enough pills."

Composition

Music and style

While still rooted in pop-punk, Untitled finds the band expanding their sonic template with darker, restless songs. The compositions on the record have been described as musically diverse and "borderline experimental," with sullen moodiness and off-kilter hooks the basis for many tracks. The record pulls from a variety of styles, including post-hardcore, electronic rock, jangle pop, and "reflective" alternative rock. Experimentation was constantly present: the band tried different mic techniques and toyed with harmonium organs, Polynesian Gamelan bells,  and turntables. The band infused these experimentalist elements into their usual pop punk sound, inspired by lifestyle changes (the band members all became fathers before the album was released) and side-projects (Box Car Racer and Transplants.) In a full article about the album in the November 20, 2003, edition of the Milwaukee Journal Sentinel, Ben Wener described the music of the album as "expansive, downcast, and sometimes spectral." The New York Times considered that the album may have been influenced by the growing popularity of emo pop, while AllMusic regarded it a delve into post-punk. "Much of the punk has been dissolved, the buzzsaw guitars faded into the corners, allowing room for staggering dynamics, cathartic guitar bursts and a weightier, more experimental and ambitious sound", wrote Tom Bryant of Kerrang!. Tim Coffman of Alternative Press noted that the record tends to leave pop punk behind altogether at times, "bringing the sounds of alternative rock and new wave into the mix." Overall, the album’s general sound has been described as pop-punk, alternative rock, and new wave.

The goal for Untitled was continuity: each song develops lyrically like chapters in a book, and songs segue into one another to present a cohesive feel instead of a regular collection of tracks.  In addition to the side-projects, the music of the album was inspired by the September 11 attacks and the onset of the Iraq War. The mood was unsettling for DeLonge, whose brother is a Navy officer: "It was so weird because we'd all be glued to the TV, watching these bombs explode over another country. So I'd see all this and wonder where he was at, and then we'd have to go into the next room and sing or finish writing lyrics. I think it affected our moods throughout the day." In addition, it was inspired by the band simply socializing together: "We would just hang out for hours talking. It was really cool," said DeLonge.

Lyrics

Critics agreed that this album represents a more "mature" Blink-182, hence the absence of songs with toilet humour or jokes for which the band had been known. "We wanted to be different," remarked DeLonge. "Some of our fans were probably like, 'Fuck, maybe they should stop joking so people could hear why I like this band.' And I think this record is going to help those kids out.". In an interview with MTV Album Launch, Hoppus said that the desired effect of the album was for people to listen to it and say, "Wait a minute...that's Blink-182?" The themes for the album include growing up and dealing with the realities of adulthood including relationship woes, daily pressures, and unexpected hardships.

The album is lyrically consumed with sorrow and uncertainty about the world. Entertainment Weekly described it as a concept album based on a dying relationship, a "self-meditation on romantic decay." "I think at this point in our career, we are better musicians and we've evolved our way of thinking as far as songwriting", DeLonge told Billboard in reference to the more mature lyricism. Hoppus, in his interview with the Milwaukee Journal Sentinel, described the lyrics as the most personal he had written to that point. While past recordings tended to meditate on feelings from high school, the band felt it was akin to a safety net and desired to write about "what's going on […] right now." Lyrics continued to be autobiographical, but the band took more time than usual on their writing. DeLonge would routinely rewrite his sections upwards of four times.

Songs

The record opens with "Feeling This", which features flanged drums and an unconventional "syncopated Latin-flavored backbeat and a harmony-rich chorus" following a series of "half-barked" vocals. "Feeling This" was the first song written for the album and illustrates a scenario of lust, ambivalence, and regret, with the protagonist of the song reflecting over his romance's dimming flame in the chorus "Fate fell short this time/Your smile fades in the summer." Hoppus and DeLonge wrote the song in two different rooms and upon meeting to discuss the song, the two realized they had both written about sex—the passionate, lustful side (reflected in the verses) and the romantic side (the choruses). It segues into "Obvious", which explores the Wall of Sound technique and features a brooding, heavy intro combined with cascading guitar riffs. "I Miss You" is an all-acoustic affair, featuring a melancholy piano, cello, upright acoustic bass, and a "brushstroked hip-hop groove." The song features references to Tim Burton's 1993 animated film The Nightmare Before Christmas with "We can live like Jack and Sally" and "We'll have Halloween on Christmas". In interviews and the liner notes for Blink-182, Barker reveals that the line was directed towards his then girlfriend, Shanna Moakler. "Violence" flicks between "bizarre, spoken jazzy verses and anthemic punk rock choruses" with lyrics that equate broken hearts with global violence.

"Stockholm Syndrome" has been described as "the most obvious examples of Blink-182's experimentation", was recorded using a microphone dating back to the 1950s, and the reverb on the vocals was achieved by playing the recordings into a shower. The drum fills for the song were recorded separately than the rest of the tracks, with the tape machines "sped up and super compressed", then played back at normal speed, to sound really "deep and gigantic", according to Hoppus in the liner notes for Blink-182.  It features an interlude before it in which Joanne Whalley reads letters Hoppus's grandfather wrote to his grandmother during World War II. DeLonge explained the letters as "real sincere, genuine letters from the worst war in history." "Down" continues the theme of longing, set to a rain-drenched soundscape. The original version of "Down" ran over six minutes long, and contained a drum and bass breakdown from Barker. "The Fallen Interlude", which functions as an outro to "Down", finds Barker showcasing different percussive techniques over a funk-tinged jazz sound. It is a near-instrumental recorded with Sick Jacken of hip-hop band Psycho Realm. "Go" is the record's only straight punk rock song. "It's a personal song," said Hoppus. "It's not specifically about my mother… I feel weird talking about it."

"Asthenia" uses real NASA transmissions from the Apollo 9 space flight. It centers on a fictional astronaut stranded in space, floating in an Apollo capsule, and contemplating whether or not to return to his home planet. The song was inspired by DeLonge's self-admitted "paranoia" regarding the future and how war and famine could affect it.

"Always" features an uptempo backbeat combined with a New Romantic-era keyboard and pulls from new wave influences; the band often jokingly called the track the "'80s song." It contains a riff reminiscent of The Only Ones' "Another Girl, Another Planet". "Easy Target" and "All of This" were based on a story from producer Jerry Finn's middle school years. Finn was in love with a female classmate, Holly, who invited him over, only to have her and her friend drench him with a hose; humiliated, he rode home on his bicycle. "All of This" is a gothic-tinged pop song that uses strings and guitar effects to create a moody atmosphere. The track "Here's Your Letter", according to Hoppus in the liner notes for Blink-182, is about "people's inability to communicate with one another and how words and explanations only confuse the issues." "I'm Lost Without You" mixes an industrial loop with piano. The latter track took many months to create, and took "over 50" different tracks, including two drum sets combined during the last minute of the song. Barker described the idea for the percussion combination as "something we always wanted to do, but never got around to" and believed the song sounded like Pink Floyd or Failure.

The UK edition of the record features B-side "Not Now", originally recorded during the sessions. "Not Now" features a church organ in its verses and guitar riffs reminiscent of the Descendents. Its subject matter continues the theme of complicated miscommunication and fading love.

Packaging and title

Due to some contradicting sources, the title of the album (or lack thereof) is debated. Travis Barker, in his memoir Can I Say, writes that "Some people think it's a self titled album, called Blink-182, but Mark [Hoppus] has always insisted it was actually untitled." A 2003 interview and article from MTV News discussing the naming of the pending album repeatedly refers to the release as the "untitled album," while a press release from that time period confirms the same. Despite this, several critics have used the terms "eponymous", "untitled", and "self-titled" in describing the album. In a 2009 MTV News article, James Montgomery refers to the album as self-titled, joking, "Or untitled … It's never really been clear." The title for the album was originally rumored to be Use Your Erection I & II, a parody of the Guns N' Roses albums Use Your Illusion I and II, but was revealed to be a joke Barker made to "get a rise out of people." DeLonge, in reference to previous joke album titles (such as Enema of the State), stated, "We didn't want to label it with a joke title that people might expect." As such, a Billboard article from the week of the album's release lists three rejected joke titles: Diarrhea de Janeiro, Vasectomy, Vasect-a-you and "Our Pet Sounds".

To support the new album, Blink-182 created an entirely new logo, a "smiley face" with Xs for each eye and five arrows on the left side of its face. According to Barker, the Blink-182 logo originated at his clothing line, Famous Stars and Straps. Barker wanted to brand an icon for the band: "It just had to be a cool kind of happy face but I wanted arrows. You know, like The Jam were my favorite band, they always had arrows in their logos and stuff. It was just kind of inspired by pop-art." Hoppus seconded this sentiment: "He spearheaded all the artwork for the record. There were smiley-face stickers and posters all over Los Angeles, and that was his idea." Barker invited his tattoo artist, Mister Cartoon, to create artwork for the record, and his good friend Estevan Oriol to handle photography. "His style, incorporated into Blink's, didn’t make us too gangster: it just gave us a bit of an edge. It was cool to feel like Blink had a dangerous side", Barker later remembered.

musicOMH described the album booklet as "...meticulously put together and resembling a Warholian pastiche." Each song includes small notes detailing the lyrical inspiration for each song, what it means to each band member, and the recording techniques used. The band originally wanted each CD booklet to be made from canvas material. Geffen gave the band a choice between the custom artwork or keeping the sale price down to US$12, and the band chose the latter, as they felt it was more important that young listeners obtain the record for less money.

Promotion and singles

Untitled was the band's first release on Geffen, which absorbed sister label MCA Records in 2003. Prior to it dissolving, MCA had attempted to penalize the band for breaking stipulations in their contract that they would have an album out by a specific quarter. MCA had previously rushed the band into recording Take Off Your Pants and Jacket, but the band had much more freedom with Geffen. "Geffen came down and heard three songs and they said, 'This is the best record you've ever done, this is the record of your career, take as much time as you want, call us when it's done.' It just completely outlined the perspective of putting accounting before creative, and when you're in the entertainment business, you've got to put creative first. It's an art, you've got to look at it like an art, treat it like an art, and then you'll get the best product in the long run."

Promotion for the record included a "golden ticket" contest – the prize being a private Blink-182 show for the winner. MTV's website streamed the full album a week before its release, beginning on November 10. As promotion for the album and single release[s], the band performed "Feeling This" on Jimmy Kimmel Live! a week after the release of the album on November 26, 2003, and "Down" on Late Show with David Letterman on May 27, 2004. Performances of "I Miss You" and "The Rock Show" on The WB's Pepsi Smash concert series from June 10, 2004, were released on the Australian Tour edition of the album, as well as the "Always" single.

The band picked "Feeling This" as the first single because it was representative of the transition the band had undergone since Take Off Your Pants and Jacket. A slightly different version of the song had been released previously as part of the soundtrack for the video game Madden NFL 2004 under the erroneous title "Action". Barker explained in an interview that "'Action' just sounded kind of dorky to us. Like we would always call it 'Feeling This' and then someone at our label, I think, like wrote it as 'Action' one time and sent out singles to people. And it was always supposed to be 'Feeling This'."  The video for "Feeling This" was recorded shortly before the release of the album in October 2003. The track peaked high at number 2 on the Billboard Modern Rock Tracks chart, hovering at that position for three weeks. "I Miss You" was commissioned as the record's second single in December 2003 when the band recorded a music video for it. "I Miss You" became arguably the most successful single from the album, becoming Blink-182's second number one hit on the Billboard Modern Rock Tracks chart during the week of April 3, 2004, until dethroned by Hoobastank's "The Reason" two weeks later.

Despite briefly considering "Easy Target" to be released as the album's third single, "Down" was released instead. The video for "Down", which features real-life ex-gang members, made its television premiere in June 2004. The single was a mixed success, peaking at number 10 on the Billboard Modern Rock Tracks chart during the week of July 31, 2004, but quickly falling off afterward. "Always" was announced as the fourth and final single from Blink-182 in August 2004. "It's gonna change people's lives and might actually change the world forever", DeLonge jokingly predicted. After deciding on the video concept, the clip was recorded and released in November 2004 and continued success all the way into January 2005. A fifth single from the album ("All of This") was discussed; however, plans were dropped following the band's declaration of an 'indefinite hiatus' in February 2005. In response to the idea of "All of This" becoming a possible single, DeLonge joked "We would love it because it's a bad-ass song, and The Cure's Robert Smith sings on it, and that makes us cooler than everybody else." However, on April 18, 2020, Hoppus explained that the song was never intended to be a single, answering a fan during a Twitch stream session.

Critical reception

The album received generally favorable reviews by music critics. At Metacritic, which assigns a normalized rating out of 100 to reviews from mainstream critics, the album received an average score of 71, based on 12 reviews. Jenny Eliscu of Rolling Stone, while giving the album four stars, wrote that "...their lyrics are still unsophisticated and lovelorn, but even the poppiest tunes prove artful". Her review regards Blink-182 as "more experimental and harder-hitting than anything else [the band] has done". It was subsequently included in the Top 50 Best of 2003 end of the year list by Rolling Stone. The album was given four stars by AllMusic's Stephen Thomas Erlewine, who called Blink-182 "an unexpected and welcome maturation from a band that just an album ago seemed permanently stuck in juvenilia." Blender's Jonah Weiner praised DeLonge's vocals, describing them as a "lean, thrilling ride through adolescent hopelessness." Many critics expressed surprise at the newfound maturity of the band, and lauded the surprise appearance of The Cure vocalist Robert Smith on the track "All of This".

The band's decision in favor of more mature material was received positively by many critics; Tim Newbound of Soul Shine Magazine wrote that "Blink show that they can retain their infectious and endearing qualities while recording music of a more thoughtful calibre." Spin described the record as emotionally intense and best experienced through headphones. USA Today Edna Gundersen felt that "Blink-182 bravely adheres to a single sober theme — a disintegrating romance — through 14 songs that adhere to its pop punk principles without recycling cartoonish accessories. Blink-182 is growing up, not growing stale." Nick Catucci of The Village Voice called the album "brilliant" and compared Blink-182 to fellow pop punk band Green Day's 2000 effort, Warning, writing, "Let it be noted, however, that Warning searches for subject matter where Blink-182 searches for meaning." Greg Kot of Entertainment Weekly wrote that "Despite their newfound earnestness, [the band] seem incapable of pretension. And in a career littered with songs about awkward moments, their latest is a dork classic." Scott Shelter of Slant gave the album four stars, stating "Giving up the fart jokes is risky business for Blink—but Blink-182 might just be the band's best album to date." Among the more negative reviews, Jason Arnopp of Q felt the majority of material forgettable but commended it as "some of their most imaginatively constructed work." The A.V. Club Stephen Thompson believed "The disc [does] meander in spots, and its most achingly sincere love songs become cloying."

Commercial performance
The album debuted at number three on the US Billboard 200 chart, with first-week sales of 313,000 copies. In comparison, Take Off Your Pants and Jacket debuted at number one and sold more than 350,000 copies in its first week. The album charted at number three, below fellow new album In the Zone by Britney Spears (number one) and above remix album Let It Be... Naked by The Beatles (number five). Untitled charted highest in Canada, where it debuted at number one. The album was also successful in other countries, debuting in the top ten in Australia and New Zealand.

The album was certified by the RIAA as platinum for shipments of over one million copies in 2004, although it has since sold over 2.2 million copies in the US and 7 million copies worldwide. It was certified by both the Music Canada and the Australian Recording Industry Association (ARIA) as double platinum. The album has also reached platinum certifications in the United Kingdom.

Touring

Blink-182 announced their first tour in support of Untitled on October 17, 2003, named the DollaBill Tour. The all-ages club tour featured support acts Bubba Sparxxx and The Kinison, and, as the name suggests, tickets were sold for $1. DeLonge explained the first return to small venues in several years in the initial press release for the tour: "For years we played in small clubs and that's where you can really connect with your fans." The tour ended shortly after the release of Untitled on November 21, 2003, at local San Diego venue SOMA. An additional concert at the Phoenix Concert Theatre on December 2, 2003, was held in Toronto, Ontario, Canada with My Chemical Romance as the opener.

A performance at KWOD's Twisted X-Mas show shortly before Christmas 2003 became the final show of the year, and a European tour followed in mid-February 2004. During an Australian tour in March 2004, Barker injured his foot and the band was forced to cancel tour dates in Japan for the rest of the month. A U.S. tour took place from late April to May 2004, and a highly publicized tour featuring Blink-182 and No Doubt was performed during June 2004 in support of Untitled and No Doubt's The Singles 1992–2003. The cancelled Australian tour dates were rescheduled and performed in August and September 2004. The band appeared on September 17, 2004, at the MTV Icon tribute to The Cure, performing a cover of "A Letter to Elise" and "All of This", which was recorded and later broadcast on October 31, 2004.  The band headed to Europe for a two-week tour near the end of the year, which culminated at their final show on December 16, 2004, at the Point Theatre in Dublin, Ireland.

Although the band had planned for a U.S. tour in support of "Always", tensions within the band had risen on the final European tour and the band announced an 'indefinite hiatus' on February 22, 2005, as breakup rumors swirled. After touring through 2004, the three essentially stopped communicating with one another. Hoppus initially had difficulty accepting the group's new direction. After some tragic events involving the band and its entourage, Blink-182 reunited in February 2009.

Legacy

The Los Angeles Times referred to Untitled as the band's "underrated masterwork," writing that the record is generally considered by "fans, critics and band members alike as its best work, Blink's answer to Pet Sounds or Sgt. Pepper's Lonely Hearts Club Band." The band themselves have regarded it as a "huge turning point" in their career, marking a change in the way they write and record music, as well as view themselves. In his memoir Can I Say, Barker writes: "It had a little bit of everything: we ventured far enough outside our genre to make ourselves happy, but not so far that we offended our fan base. It was a perfect happy medium, and it's the Blink album that Mark, Tom, and I are most proud of."

The band celebrated the tenth anniversary of the album by performing it in full in November 2013. After a pair of Hollywood Palladium shows sold out in a record 32 seconds, the band added three additional dates at The Wiltern in Los Angeles, which also sold out. MTV News called it "a fitting tribute to an album that, in the decade since it was first released, has become a bit of a touchstone — a defining moment not just for the band, but for the genre of punk, in all its permutations." Jon Blistein of Radio.com called the album "an unquestionable masterpiece" in the site's "Not Fade Away" series, which examines "some of the greatest albums of the past few decades." In it, he writes on the album's influence: "Untitled was the band's most concise break from the pop punk formula and a catalyst for the wave of pierced-hearts-stuck-to-sleeves-with-tears-and-guyliner "emo" outfits that rose to popularity in its wake (sans the potty humor, of course), including but not limited to Fall Out Boy, My Chemical Romance and Panic! at the Disco."

Track listing

 Digital releases set the spoken-word section of track 4 "Violence", performed by Joanne Whalley, as a separate track titled "Stockholm Syndrome Interlude", incrementing all subsequent tracks by 1.

Personnel
Per the Blink-182 liner notes.

Blink-182
Mark Hoppus – bass guitar, vocals
Tom DeLonge – guitar, vocals
Travis Barker – drums, percussion; backing vocals on "Obvious"; whispers on "Down"

Additional musicians
 Robert Smith – vocals on "All of This"
 Ron "Menno" Froese – guitar, vocals on "The Fallen Interlude"
 Roger Joseph Manning, Jr. – keyboards
 John Morrical – additional keyboards on "All of This", assistant engineer
 Ken Andrews – additional instrumentation on "Violence" and "Obvious"
 Joanne Whalley – spoken words on "Stockholm Syndrome Interlude"

Artwork
 Max Gramajo – cover illustration (with Blink-182)
 Estavan Oriol – photography
 Sonny Flats – design, layout
 Scandalous – design, layout
 Mr. Cartoon – design, layout

Production
 Jerry Finn – producer, mix engineer of "Feeling This", "The Fallen Interlude", "Asthenia", and "Here's Your Letter"
 Sick Jacken – producer of "The Fallen Interlude"
 Nikos Constant – producer
 Moises Velez – producer
 Tom Lord-Alge – mix engineer of "Obvious", "I Miss You", "Down", and "All of This"
 Andy Wallace – mix engineer of "Violence", "Stockholm Syndrome", "Go", and "Easy Target"
 Ryan Hewitt – mix engineer of "Always" and "I'm Lost Without You", engineer
 Ron "Menno" Froese – engineer @ Ayaic Studio of "The Fallen Interlude"
 Sam Boukas – assistant engineer
 James McCrone – assistant engineer
 Alan Mason – assistant engineer
 Seth Waldman – assistant engineer
 Steve Sisco – assistant engineer
 Femio Hernandez – assistant engineer
 Brian Gardner – mastering engineer

Chart positions

Weekly charts

Year-end charts

Certifications

References

External links

 Blink-182 at YouTube (streamed copy where licensed)
 Blink-182 at Last.fm
 

2003 albums
Albums produced by Jerry Finn
Blink-182 albums
Geffen Records albums
Interscope Geffen A&M Records albums